Darkylakh (Darkılaax) is a rural locality (a selo), the only inhabited locality, and the administrative center of Chyamayykinsky Rural Okrug of Megino-Kangalassky District in the Sakha Republic, Russia, located  from Nizhny Bestyakh, the administrative center of the district. Its population as of the 2010 Census was 434, of whom 222 were male and 212 female, down from 486 as recorded during the 2002 Census.

Geography
The village is located by the Tamma river.

References

Notes

Sources
Official website of the Sakha Republic. Registry of the Administrative-Territorial Divisions of the Sakha Republic. Megino-Kangalassky District. 

Rural localities in Megino-Kangalassky District